Yennun Huang from the Vee TIME Corp., Taipei, Taiwan was named Fellow of the Institute of Electrical and Electronics Engineers (IEEE) in 2012 for contributions to fault tolerant and failure avoidance software.

See also
Glossary of electrical and electronics engineering
History of software engineering
Software engineering

References

Fellow Members of the IEEE
Living people
Year of birth missing (living people)
Place of birth missing (living people)